Sandra Dimbour (born 13 June 1970) is a French badminton player from Racing Club de France, Paris. Join the INSEP in 1989, Dimbour competed in three consecutive Summer Olympics in 1992, 1996, and 2000. She had won 15 times National Championships, 8 in the singles, 5 in the women's doubles, and 2 in the mixed doubles event. After retirement from the international tournament, she started a career as a badminton coach. Dimbour was a member of the French National Olympic and Sports Committee from 2002-2009.

Achievements

IBF International 
Women's singles

Women's doubles

References

External links 

 
 
 

1970 births
Living people
Sportspeople from Saint-Denis, Seine-Saint-Denis
French female badminton players
Badminton players at the 1992 Summer Olympics
Badminton players at the 1996 Summer Olympics
Badminton players at the 2000 Summer Olympics
Olympic badminton players of France
Badminton coaches